Thornborough is a village and civil parish in north Buckinghamshire, England, around  east of Buckingham.

History

The village name is Anglo-Saxon in origin, and means "hill where thorn trees grow". It was recorded as Torneberge in the Domesday Book of 1086, as Tornburuwe in the 13th century, and as Thornborowe in the 16th century.

An Inclosure Act for Thornborough was passed in 1797.

The village has the earthworks of a Roman village on its western border, in between Thornborough Bridge and the main village. Near the bridge on the north side of the road are the Thornborough Mounds, two tumuli in which Roman remains were found in 1839. They are a scheduled monument.

Buildings
There is a manor house with associated tithe barns in the centre of the village next to the pond.

The village church, St Mary, is one of very few in Britain to have steel bells. The church has been repaired, restored and extended many times with some parts dating back to the 12th century. The tower was built early in the 15th century and the south porch about 1480.

The village pub, The Two Brewers, is a thatched building with two bars. It has been run by the same family for over 25 years. A second pub, The Lone Tree, on the outskirts of the village on the A421 closed for refurbishment in 2004 and shortly after re-opening it was severely damaged by fire on 26 November 2007. Abandoned and in serious need of repair, it was delicensed and sold as a private dwelling in 2014, since when the thatched roof has been removed.

To the north of the village is the remains of an old windmill and on the River Great Ouse are the buildings of what used to be a working watermill. The disused Buckingham Arm of the Grand Union Canal runs between Buckingham and Western Milton Keynes to the north of Thornborough.

Thornborough Bridge

Located on the western boundary of the parish with Buckingham, Thornborough Bridge dates from the 14th century and is the only surviving mediaeval bridge in the county. The parish boundary follows the line of Padbury Brook (which joins the river Great Ouse at 'The Twins'). The new bridge taking the A421 was built in 1974.

References

External links

 Parish Council website

Villages in Buckinghamshire
Civil parishes in Buckinghamshire